Danaphryne nigrifilis is a species of dreamer widespread in the temperate to tropical regions of the oceans where it is found at depths of around . This species is the only known member of its genus.

References
 

Oneirodidae
Taxa named by Charles Tate Regan
Taxa named by Ethelwynn Trewavas
Fish described in 1932